The 1998 British Grand Prix (formally the LI RAC British Grand Prix) was a Formula One motor race held at the Silverstone Circuit, England on 12 July 1998. It was the ninth race of the 1998 FIA Formula One World Championship. The 60-lap race was won by Michael Schumacher driving a Ferrari car after starting from second position. Mika Häkkinen, who started from pole position, finished second with Eddie Irvine third in the other Ferrari. Schumacher's victory was his fourth of the season, and his third consecutive victory having won both the preceding Canadian and French Grand Prix, but was under controversial circumstances: there was dispute whether he had avoided a stop-and-go penalty by entering the pit lane to serve it on the final lap, crossing the finish line in the pit lane to win the race before reaching his pit box, although the penalty, which was actually merely a time penalty, was later rescinded.

Report

Qualifying 
Mika Häkkinen took pole position by nearly half a second from championship rival Michael Schumacher. Jacques Villeneuve took third position whilst Häkkinen's team-mate David Coulthard qualified in fourth. Ralf Schumacher and Olivier Panis had their qualifying times deleted as they were not able to get out of their cars quick enough during an FIA safety drill, to practice evacuating the cockpit in case of fire. Ralf Schumacher had spun and stalled his engine early in qualifying and qualified in the spare car, which was set up for his team-mate Damon Hill.

Race
Heavy rain fell during the morning prior to the race. Although the rain stopped before the start, there was a mixture of wet and dry parts on the circuit and as a result all but two cars started on intermediate compound tyres. The two Stewart-Fords decided to start on dry weather tyres. The first retirement came after 13 laps, when Damon Hill lost control on the damp track whilst battling with Villeneuve for 7th place. After 16 laps, it began to rain again, and many drivers switched to a full wet weather tyre. Johnny Herbert spun and regained the track, but had damaged his car and retired on reaching the pits.

David Coulthard, driving on intermediates, spun out on lap 38 whilst passing a backmarker. Jarno Trulli spun out on the same lap as Coulthard as Barrichello spun out and hit the wall at Club on lap 40. His McLaren-Mercedes team-mate Mika Häkkinen had built up a lead of 49 seconds over second place driver Michael Schumacher when four laps later he went off the track, did a complete 360 degrees turn before continuing. The incident damaged the front wing of his car and cost him 10 seconds of his lead but following numerous other spins caused by the worsening conditions the safety car was deployed which slowed the cars down, and removed Häkkinen's advantage over Schumacher altogether.

The race restarted on lap 50 and it took only two laps for Häkkinen to make another mistake, which put Schumacher in the lead. The German quickly pulled away from his rival, who was now nursing his McLaren home.

However, two laps from the finish, Schumacher was issued with a 10-second penalty for passing Alexander Wurz under the safety car on lap 43. Unsure whether the handwritten notification declared that Schumacher would see 10 seconds being added to his race time or had to serve a 10-second stop-and-go penalty, his team decided to call in him into the pits out of precaution to serve a stop-and-go penalty at the end of the last lap of the race. However, in doing so Schumacher crossed the finish line in the pit lane before reaching the Ferrari garage resulting in a dispute on whether he had actually served a stop and go penalty.

Post-race 
Following the race a dispute arose surrounding the circumstances of Michael Schumacher being issued with and serving his penalty.  His team argued that the penalty should have been issued within 25 minutes of the incident but instead they were informed after 31 minutes. They also argued that the hand-written notification was unclear as to which penalty was actually being issued: a stop-and-go, or a 10-second addition to Schumacher's race time, though the FIA's International Court of Appeal later clarified that it was the latter. The stewards then decided to nevertheless apply the 10-second addition, post-race. However, the added time penalty can only be used to punish an infraction in the last 12 laps of a Grand Prix, and so did not apply here. The stewards eventually rescinded the penalty altogether.

A protest was lodged by McLaren-Mercedes who felt Ferrari cheated by not having Schumacher serve the penalty, but this was rejected by the FIA. At the hearing for the protest the International Court of Appeal confirmed that the stewards have made several mistakes in issuing a 10-second time penalty for an incident that happened outside of the last 12 laps of a race while exceeding the allowed time limit for the notification of a penalty having been issued.  As a result of their mistakes, the three stewards involved handed in their licenses at an extraordinary meeting of the FIA World Council.

Classification

Qualifying 

Notes
 – Qualification times of Ralf Schumacher and Olivier Panis were disallowed because they failed an FIA safety drill.

Race

Championship standings after the race

Drivers' Championship standings

Constructors' Championship standings

 Note: Only the top five positions are included for both sets of standings.

Footnotes

British Grand Prix
British Grand Prix
Grand Prix
British Grand Prix
Formula One controversies